Blind Joe Hill (January 7, 1931 – November 17, 1999) was an American blues singer, guitarist, harmonica player and drummer.

A one-man band, he was adopted and named Joe Thomas Hill after being born in Pennsylvania, United States. He played in the styles of Joe Hill Louis and Doctor Ross. He used his craggy vocals supported by guitar, bass, and drums, and was one of the last practitioners of the one-man blues band tradition. Hill recorded two albums under his own name on the Barrelhouse and L+R labels, and was part of the 1985 American Folk Blues Festival touring Europe.

He died in Los Angeles, California, and was cremated on November 17, 1999.

References

1931 births
1998 deaths
Country blues musicians
Juke Joint blues musicians
American blues singers
Songwriters from West Virginia
American blues guitarists
American male guitarists
Singers from West Virginia
20th-century American guitarists
20th-century American drummers
American male drummers
Guitarists from West Virginia
People from Dunbar, West Virginia
African-American male songwriters
African-American guitarists
20th-century African-American male singers